One of the Baffin Island offshore island groups, the Carter Islands are located in Frobisher Bay, west/southwest of Iqaluit. They are part of the Qikiqtaaluk Region, in the Canadian territory of Nunavut.

References 

Archipelagoes of Baffin Island
Uninhabited islands of Qikiqtaaluk Region
Islands of Frobisher Bay